Parliamentary elections were held in the Comoros on 7 March 1982, following the early dissolution of the Federal Assembly by President Ahmed Abdallah on 25 January. There were 38 constituencies (18 on Grande Comore, 15 on Anjouan and 5 on Mohéli), each of which elected a single member. In February the Comorian Union for Progress had been created as the sole legal party, and its candidates won 37 of the 38 seats.

Eighteen seats were won outright on election day, whilst a second round was held in the remaining 20 constituencies where no candidate won more than 50% of the vote on 14 March.

Results

References

Elections in the Comoros
1982 in the Comoros
One-party elections
Comoros
Election and referendum articles with incomplete results
March 1982 events in Africa